A panhandle is a geographic term for an elongated protrusion of a geopolitical entity.

The term comes from the shape of the handle attached to a pan (See: Frying pan or Saucepan).

Panhandle may also refer to:

Places in the United States
 Alaskan Panhandle
 Alabama Panhandle
 Connecticut Panhandle
 Florida Panhandle
 Idaho Panhandle
 Idaho Panhandle National Forests
 Maryland Panhandle
 Nebraska Panhandle
 Oklahoma Panhandle
 Panhandle (San Francisco), a park in San Francisco, California
 Panhandle, Ohio
 Panhandle, Texas
 Texas Panhandle
 Eastern Panhandle of West Virginia
 Northern Panhandle of West Virginia

Other uses
 Panhandle (film), a 1948 film
 Panhandle Pete, a character from the game Adventures in the Magic Kingdom
 Columbus Panhandles, a former National Football league team
Begging, which is sometimes referred to as "panhandling"

da:Panhandle